Charlie Straight were a Czech indie rock band formed in Třinec in 2006. They combined indie rock with melodic and often electronic musical elements, and all their lyrics were sung in English. They released two studio albums and won a number of awards, before breaking up in 2013. Lead singer Albert Černý went on to form the indie pop group Lake Malawi, who represented the Czech Republic at the Eurovision Song Contest 2019 in Tel Aviv, Israel.

History
Charlie Straight was formed in 2006 by Albert Černý (lead vocals), Jan Cienciala (bass), Michal Šupák (guitar, programming), and Pavel Pilch (drums). Pilch had been Černý's drum teacher, as well as playing in several jazz bands with Šupák, an AMU graduate. Cienciala had been a classmate of Černý's in grammar school and they had also played music together.

The band released their debut album, She's a Good Swimmer, in 2009. In addition to receiving positive reviews, the record was nominated for a Český slavík award and won three prizes at that year's Anděl Awards, in the categories Discovery of the Year, Best Music Video ("Platonic Johny"), and Best Album. They played numerous concerts and festivals, and garnered a fan base not only locally but even abroad.

In 2010, Charlie Straight won the first MTV Europe Music Award for Best Czech & Slovak Act. It was presented by crooner Karel Gott. A year later, they received the same honour.

In 2012, the band released their sophomore record, titled Someone with a Slow Heartbeat. A year later, they toured the UK, released the single "I Sleep Alone", featuring vocals by Markéta Irglová, and won an Anděl Award for Song of the Year with "Coco". Later the same year, they announced that they were splitting up. Albert Černý formed the indie pop group Lake Malawi, guitarist Michal Šupák launched the band Noisy Pots, and bassist Johnny Cienciala started the project Big Destiny.

Band members
 Albert Černý – vocals, guitar
 Jan Cienciala – bass
 Michal Šupák – guitar, programming
 Pavel Pilch – drums

Discography

Albums
 She's a Good Swimmer (2009)
 Someone with a Slow Heartbeat (2012)

Singles
 "I Sleep Alone (feat. Markéta Irglová)" (2013)

Awards
 Nominated – 2009 Český slavík – Discovery of the Year for She's a Good Swimmer
 2009 Anděl Awards – Discovery of the Year, Best Music Video, and Best Album for She's a Good Swimmer
 MTV Europe Music Award for Best Czech & Slovak Act 2010, 2011
 2011 Český slavík – Music Video of the Year
 2012 Český slavík – Internet Star
 2013 Anděl Award – Song of the Year for "Coco"

References

External links
 

Czech rock music groups
Czech pop music groups
Musical groups established in 2006
Musical groups from Třinec
2006 establishments in the Czech Republic
Musical groups disestablished in 2013
2013 disestablishments in the Czech Republic